Unbecoming Age, also known as The Magic Bubble, is a 1992 American comedy film directed by Alfredo Ringel and Deborah Ringel and starring George Clooney and Diane Salinger.
The film tells the story of woman who, for her 40th birthday, wishes to forget how old she is. A bottle of magic bubbles makes her wish come true, instantly transforming Julia into an ageless and happy woman.

Cast
 Diane Salinger — Julia
 John Calvin — Charles
 Colleen Camp — Deborah
 Priscilla Pointer — Grandma
 George Clooney — Mac
 Shera Danese — Letty
 Nicholas Guest — Dooley
 Don Diamont — Alfredo

Critical reception
On her The Movie Archive Review website, Marjorie Johns awarded the film a score of six out of ten, stating that the film's "fantasy elements work well" and concluding that "it's a sweet natured, unpretentious little movie and not Scorsese".

Film critic Todd McCarthy of Variety based his negative review of the film on the fact that "the fantasy element...is exasperatingly tame", claiming that the screenwriters "have kept their imaginations too inhibited and domesticated where greater flights of fancy would have been welcome". McCarthy did agree that his "sympathy goes out to Salinger" for her ability to "remain somewhat likable" and that a "number of talented thesps brighten up the supporting cast" even though "few will count this among their more stellar credits".

Critic Peter Rainer of Los Angeles Times summarized his opinion with the opening sentence of his review titled "Magic Bubbles Can't Help Un-Becoming". He stated: "The comic premise of Un-Becoming Age...doesn't make a whit of sense".

Notes

External links

1992 films
American romantic fantasy films
1990s fantasy comedy films
1990s romantic fantasy films
American fantasy comedy films
1992 comedy films
1990s English-language films
1990s American films